Eumachia is a genus of flowering plant in the family Rubiaceae. Its species are native to tropical and subtropical regions worldwide. The genus was established by Augustin Pyramus de Candolle in 1830.

Species
, Plants of the World Online accepted the following species:

Eumachia abrupta (Hiern) J.H.Kirkbr.
Eumachia acuifolia Delprete & J.H.Kirkbr.
Eumachia agustinae (Acuña) C.M.Taylor & Razafim.
Eumachia albert-smithii (Standl.) Delprete & J.H.Kirkbr.
Eumachia amoena (A.C.Sm.) Barrabé, C.M.Taylor & Razafim.
Eumachia aneityensis (Guillaumin) Barrabé, C.M.Taylor & Razafim.
Eumachia archboldiana (Fosberg) Barrabé, C.M.Taylor & Razafim.
Eumachia astrellantha (Wernham) Delprete & J.H.Kirkbr.
Eumachia balabacensis (Merr.) Barrabé, C.M.Taylor & Razafim.
Eumachia boliviana (Standl.) Delprete & J.H.Kirkbr.
Eumachia carnea (G.Forst.) DC.
Eumachia cephalantha (Müll.Arg.) Delprete & J.H.Kirkbr.
Eumachia chaenotricha (DC.) C.M.Taylor & Razafim.
Eumachia chlorocalyx (K.Schum.) Barrabé, C.M.Taylor & Razafim.
Eumachia coffeosperma (K.Schum.) Razafim. & C.M.Taylor
Eumachia collina (Labill.) Barrabé, C.M.Taylor & Razafim.
Eumachia cupulicalyx (Verdc.) Razafim. & C.M.Taylor
Eumachia cymuligera (Müll.Arg.) C.M.Taylor & Razafim.
Eumachia damasiana (Sohmer) Barrabé, C.M.Taylor & Razafim.
Eumachia deinocalyx (Sandwith) Delprete & J.H.Kirkbr.
Eumachia depauperata (Müll.Arg.) M.R.V.Barbosa & M.S.Pereira
Eumachia domatiicola (De Wild.) Razafim. & C.M.Taylor
Eumachia evansensis (A.C.Sm.) Barrabé, C.M.Taylor & Razafim.
Eumachia extensa (Miq.) I.M.Turner
Eumachia forsteriana (A.Gray) Barrabé, C.M.Taylor & Razafim.
Eumachia frutescens (C.T.White) Barrabé, C.M.Taylor & Razafim.
Eumachia galorei (Sohmer) Barrabé, C.M.Taylor & Razafim.
Eumachia geminodens (K.Schum.) Barrabé, C.M.Taylor & Razafim.
Eumachia goodenoughiensis (Sohmer) Barrabé, C.M.Taylor & Razafim.
Eumachia gossweileri (Cavaco) Razafim. & C.M.Taylor
Eumachia guianensis (Bremek.) Delprete & J.H.Kirkbr.
Eumachia haematocarpa (Standl.) C.M.Taylor & Razafim.
Eumachia hassleriana (Chodat) C.M.Taylor & Razafim.
Eumachia horsfieldiana (Miq.) Barrabé, C.M.Taylor & Razafim.
Eumachia huallagae (Standl.) C.M.Taylor & Razafim.
Eumachia impatiens (Dwyer) C.M.Taylor & Razafim.
Eumachia inaequifolia (Müll.Arg.) C.M.Taylor & Razafim.
Eumachia incompta (A.C.Sm.) Barrabé, C.M.Taylor & Razafim.
Eumachia inconspicua (C.M.Taylor) C.M.Taylor & Razafim.
Eumachia insidens (Hiern) Razafim. & C.M.Taylor
Eumachia kappleri (Miq.) Delprete & J.H.Kirkbr.
Eumachia lanceifolia (Urb.) C.M.Taylor & Razafim.
Eumachia lepiniana (Baill. ex Drake) Barrabé, C.M.Taylor & Razafim.
Eumachia leptothyrsa (Miq.) Barrabé, C.M.Taylor & Razafim.
Eumachia letouzeyi (Robbr.) Razafim. & C.M.Taylor
Eumachia longistylis (Hiern) Razafim. & C.M.Taylor
Eumachia lophoclada (Hiern) Razafim. & C.M.Taylor
Eumachia lyciiflora (Baill.) Barrabé, C.M.Taylor & Razafim.
Eumachia macrocarpa (Verdc.) Razafim. & C.M.Taylor
Eumachia membranacea (Gillespie) Delprete & J.H.Kirkbr.
Eumachia membranifolia (Bartl. ex DC.) Barrabé, C.M.Taylor & Razafim.
Eumachia merrilliana (Sohmer) Barrabé, C.M.Taylor & Razafim.
Eumachia microdon (DC.) Delprete & J.H.Kirkbr.
Eumachia monopedicellata (Sohmer) Barrabé, C.M.Taylor & Razafim.
Eumachia montana (Blume) I.M.Turner
Eumachia nana (K.Krause) Delprete & J.H.Kirkbr.
Eumachia novohiberiensis (Sohmer) Barrabé, C.M.Taylor & Razafim.
Eumachia nutans (Sw.) C.M.Taylor & Razafim.
Eumachia obanensis (Wernham) Razafim. & C.M.Taylor
Eumachia obovoidea (Verdc.) Razafim. & C.M.Taylor
Eumachia oddonii (De Wild.) Razafim. & C.M.Taylor
Eumachia oleoides (Baill.) Barrabé, C.M.Taylor & Razafim.
Eumachia oncocarpa (K.Schum.) Barrabé, C.M.Taylor & Razafim.
Eumachia ovoidea (Pierre ex Pit.) Barrabé, C.M.Taylor & Razafim.
Eumachia pallidinervia (Steyerm.) Delprete & J.H.Kirkbr.
Eumachia parviflora (R.D.Good) Razafim. & C.M.Taylor
Eumachia paupertina (Standl. & Steyerm.) Delprete & J.H.Kirkbr.
Eumachia podocephala (Müll.Arg.) Delprete & J.H.Kirkbr.
Eumachia poggei (K.Schum.) Razafim. & C.M.Taylor
Eumachia purariensis (Sohmer) Barrabé, C.M.Taylor & Razafim.
Eumachia ramisulca (Verdc.) Razafim. & C.M.Taylor
Eumachia rostrata (Blume) I.M.Turner
Eumachia rotundifolia (R.D.Good) Razafim. & C.M.Taylor
Eumachia saidoriensis (Sohmer) Barrabé, C.M.Taylor & Razafim.
Eumachia samoana (K.Schum.) Barrabé, C.M.Taylor & Razafim.
Eumachia savaiiensis (Rech.) Barrabé, C.M.Taylor & Razafim.
Eumachia schmielei (Warb.) Barrabé, C.M.Taylor & Razafim.
Eumachia sciadephora (Hiern) Razafim. & C.M.Taylor
Eumachia sclerocarpa (Whistler) Barrabé, C.M.Taylor & Razafim.
Eumachia straminea (Hutch.) Barrabé, C.M.Taylor & Razafim.
Eumachia trichostoma (Merr. & L.M.Perry) Barrabé, C.M.Taylor & Razafim.
Eumachia triflora (Urb.) C.M.Taylor & Razafim.
Eumachia vaupelii (Whistler) Barrabé, C.M.Taylor & Razafim.
Eumachia viridicalyx (R.D.Good) Razafim. & C.M.Taylor
Eumachia wildemaniana (T.Durand ex De Wild.) Razafim. & C.M.Taylor
Eumachia wilhelminensis (Steyerm.) Delprete & J.H.Kirkbr.

References

Palicoureeae
Rubiaceae genera